The following Confederate States Army units and commanders fought in the Knoxville Campaign and subsequent East Tennessee operations during the American Civil War from November 4 to December 31, 1863, under the command of Lt. Gen. James Longstreet. Engagements of this campaign include the Battle of Dandridge and the Battle of Bean's Station. Order of battle compiled from the army organization during the campaign. The Union order of battle is shown separately.

Abbreviations used

Military rank
 LTG = Lieutenant General
 MG = Major General
 BG = Brigadier General
 Col = Colonel
 Ltc = Lieutenant Colonel
 Maj = Major
 Cpt = Captain
 Lt = Lieutenant

Other
 w = wounded
 mw = mortally wounded
 k = killed
 c = captured

Longstreet's Command
LTG James Longstreet

Cavalry Corps
MG William T. Martin

Notes

References
U.S. War Department, The War of the Rebellion: a Compilation of the Official Records of the Union and Confederate Armies, U.S. Government Printing Office, 1880–1901.
 Antietam on the Web website
 National Park Service - Civil War Battle Summaries website

American Civil War orders of battle